Hassan Ahmad Palang (born 2 April 1998), is an Iranian-Qatari professional footballer who plays as a forward for Qatar Stars League side Al-Sailiya SC.

Career statistics

Club

Notes

Honours

Club
Al-Sadd
 Qatar Stars League: 2018-19, 2020-21
 Qatar Cup: 2017, 2021
 Emir of Qatar Cup: 2017, 2020
 Sheikh Jassim Cup: 2017
 Qatari Stars Cup: 2019-20

References

External links

Qatari footballers
1998 births
Living people
Aspire Academy (Qatar) players
Al Sadd SC players
LASK players
Umm Salal SC players
Al-Wakrah SC players
Al Ahli SC (Doha) players
Qatar Stars League players
Expatriate footballers in Austria
Qatari expatriate sportspeople in Austria
Qatari expatriate footballers
Association football forwards
Qatari people of Iranian descent
Sportspeople of Iranian descent
Naturalised citizens of Qatar
Qatar youth international footballers
Qatar under-20 international footballers